Littlefield is a surname. Notable people bearing it include:

 Alfred H. Littlefield (1829–1893), Governor of Rhode Island and brother of Daniel
 Arthur W. Littlefield co-founder of publishers Rowman & Littlefield
 Bill Littlefield (b. 1948), sports writer and radio show host
 Catherine Littlefield (1905–1951), American ballerina, choreographer, founder of the Philadelphia Ballet
 Clyde Littlefield (1892–1981), American football and track and field coach at the University of Texas
 Daniel Littlefield (1822–1891), Central Falls haircloth magnate, Lieutenant governor of Rhode Island, and brother of Alfred
 Dave Littlefield (b. 1960), former general manager of the Pittsburgh Pirates
 Dick Littlefield (1926–1997), American baseball pitcher
 Edmund Wattis Littlefield (1914–2001), CEO of Utah Construction Company
 Esther Littlefield (1906–1997), Tlingit artist based in Sitka, Alaska
 George H. Littlefield (1842–1919), Union Civil War Medal of Honor recipient
 George W. Littlefield (1842–1920), Confederate officer, cattleman, banker and regent of the University of Texas
 Henry Littlefield (1933–2000), American educator, originator of political interpretations of The Wonderful Wizard of Oz
 Jacques Littlefield (1949–2009), founder of the Military Vehicle Technology Foundation (MVTF)
 Little Willie Littlefield (1931–2013), American blues musician
 Milton Smith Littlefield (1830–1899), Union general in American Civil War
Sherri Nienass Littlefield (b. 1987), American artist and art dealer